Adam Rhys Mekki (born 24 December 1991) is an English football midfielder of Welsh descent who plays for Bath City on loan from Dorking Wanderers.

Playing career

Club
Mekki spent his youth at the Reading academy, before switching to Aldershot Town in 2006. He signed a professional contract with the club in the summer of 2009. In January 2011 he was loaned out to Southern Football League Premier Division side Oxford City, scoring two goals in six appearances. He made his Aldershot debut on 12 February 2011, replacing Jermaine McGlashan 81 minutes into a goalless draw at the Recreation Ground. He made his second appearance on 8 March, playing 45 minutes of a 1–0 win over Torquay United after replacing Albert Jarrett at half-time. On 26 April, it was announced that he had signed a two-year contract extension with the club. Mekki left Aldershot on 17 June 2014 after failing to agree terms on a new deal.

Mekki joined Barnet on a short-term deal on 12 August 2014. He made his debut when he started a home game against Dartford on 25 August. After eleven appearances in all competitions, without scoring, Mekki was released by Barnet to find first-team football elsewhere. He was not paid a wage during his time at the club.

Mekki signed for Dover Athletic on 15 January 2015 until the end of the season.

After leaving Dover, Mekki had a trial with Tranmere Rovers, in which he scored in a pre-season friendly against Shrewsbury Town. The trial was successful, and Mekki signed a six-month contract with the club. Following a successful season, Mekki signed a new one-year deal with Tranmere, with the option for a further 12 months.

At the end of the 2016–2017 season, Mekki was released by Tranmere and signed for National League rivals Bromley.

On 7 June 2017, Mekki signed for Bromley.

Having been defeated in the National League South play-off final for Ebbsfleet United, Mekki joined winning finalists Dorking Wanderers in June 2022. In February 2023, he joined Bath City on a one-month loan deal.

International
In August 2012 Mekki was named as a standby player for the Wales under-21 squad.

Career statistics

Club

Honours
Bromley
FA Trophy runner-up: 2017–18

References

External links

Profile at the official Aldershot Town site

1991 births
Living people
Sportspeople from Chester
English footballers
Welsh footballers
Association football midfielders
Aldershot Town F.C. players
Oxford City F.C. players
Carshalton Athletic F.C. players
Dorchester Town F.C. players
Basingstoke Town F.C. players
Barnet F.C. players
Dover Athletic F.C. players
Tranmere Rovers F.C. players
Bromley F.C. players
Ebbsfleet United F.C. players
Dorking Wanderers F.C. players
Bath City F.C. players
English Football League players
National League (English football) players
Isthmian League players
English people of Tunisian descent
Welsh people of Tunisian descent